Büro Concordia was an organisation of Joseph Goebbels' Ministry of Propaganda in Nazi Germany that operated clandestine or "black" radio stations that broadcast into Allied and neutral countries. The service was designed to appeal to discontented minorities and included Radio Caledonia, which was targeted at Scottish nationalists, and the Christian Peace Movement station which was aimed at Christian pacifists. It was presented as though it was domestically generated by internal dissidents rather than broadcast from abroad by the Nazi regime.

Incomplete list of Büro Concordia stations
Büro Concordia ran 19 black stations, not all simultaneously:
 Christian Peace Movement
 Lenin's Old Guard
 Nutcracker
 Radio Caledonia
 Radio Free America
 Radio Free India
 Radio Humanite
 Radio National
 Station Debunk
 Voice of Free Arabia
 Worker's Challenge

See also
 List of English-language broadcasters for Nazi Germany

References 

Nazi propaganda organizations
Radio in Nazi Germany